The West Indies women's cricket team toured India in November 2016. The tour consisted of a series of three One Day Internationals which are part of the 2014–16 ICC Women's Championship and three Twenty20 Internationals. India won the ODI series 3–0 and the West Indies won the T20I series 3–0.

Squads

ODI series

1st ODI

2nd ODI

3rd ODI

T20I series

1st T20I

2nd T20I

3rd T20I

References

External links
 Series home at ESPN Cricinfo

International cricket competitions in 2016–17
India 2016
2014–16 ICC Women's Championship
Women's international cricket tours of India
2016–17 Indian women's cricket
2016 in West Indian cricket
2016 in women's cricket